Anthony Campbell (born May 7, 1962) is an American former professional National Basketball Association (NBA) player.

Campbell played prep basketball at Teaneck High School in Teaneck, New Jersey, graduating in 1980. A 6'7" small forward out of Ohio State University, Campbell was selected 20th overall by the Detroit Pistons in the 1984 NBA draft. He was traded to the Los Angeles Lakers in 1987.

Campbell became the first player to earn an NBA ring (1987–88 Lakers) and CBA ring (Albany Patroons) in the same season.

Campbell struggled for playing time during his stint in Los Angeles. In 1989 he was signed as an unrestricted free agent by the Minnesota Timberwolves, for whom he averaged 23.2 points and 5.5 rebounds per game in their inaugural season. He held the Timberwolves' original all-time scoring record, scoring 4,888 points, before having his record later broken by Doug West.

After his time with the Timberwolves, Campbell played for the New York Knicks, Dallas Mavericks and Cleveland Cavaliers before leaving the NBA in 1995.

From 2007 to February 16, 2018, he was the Director of Athletics and head basketball coach at Bay Ridge Preparatory School in Brooklyn, New York. He has since left the school.

References

External links
College & NBA stats @ basketballreference.com
basketpedya.com
"Tony Campbell’s Career Takes Off" by Doug Ward - Dec. 6, 1990
"One-on-One - Tony Campbell" - Mar. 16, 2006
Bay Ridge Preparatory School: Athletics Staff

1962 births
Living people
AEK B.C. players
Albany Patroons players
American expatriate basketball people in Greece
American men's basketball players
Basketball coaches from New Jersey
Basketball players from New Jersey
Cleveland Cavaliers players
Dallas Mavericks players
Detroit Pistons draft picks
Detroit Pistons players
Florida Beachdogs players
Greek Basket League players
High school basketball coaches in New York (state)
Los Angeles Lakers players
Minnesota Timberwolves players
New York Knicks players
Ohio State Buckeyes men's basketball players
Small forwards
Sportspeople from Bergen County, New Jersey
Teaneck High School alumni